Nemanja Mitrović may refer to:

 Nemanja Mitrović (basketball) (born 1990), Canadian-Bosnian basketball player
 Nemanja Mitrović (footballer) (born 1992), Slovenian footballer